The Princess is a 2022 British documentary film about Diana, Princess of Wales, directed by Ed Perkins. The film is produced by Lightbox in association with Sky and HBO Documentary Films.

Summary
Told in the present tense, this documentary draws on recently revealed testimony and rarely seen archival footage to immerse viewers in the most iconic moments of the princess's life.

Release
The film premiered at Sundance Film Festival on 19 January 2022, prior to its UK premiere at Sundance London on 11 June, and a UK nationwide theatrical release on 30 June. It premiered in the US on 13 August 2022, on both the HBO TV channel and the HBO Max streaming service, with its UK television premiere the following day on Sky Documentaries and Now. In Mexico it premiered on 1 September 2022. It premiered in Japan on 30 September 2022, with "Forever You" by Japanese artist Zard featured as the theme song.

Reception

Box office
The film was released theatrically in a few territories including the United Kingdom, Australia, Finland, Norway and the Netherlands with a worldwide box office total of $101,188.

Criticalities response
On the review aggregator Rotten Tomatoes, the film holds an approval rating of 85% based on 87 reviews, with an average rating of TBD. The website's critical consensus reads: "The Princess may not add anything truly new to its subject's story, but in recontextualizing the details of her public life, it forces the viewer to rethink them."

References

External links 
 
 Official trailer
 Rotten Tomatoes
 Metacritic reviews

2022 films
2022 documentary films
British documentary films
Collage film
Documentary films about the media
Films about Diana, Princess of Wales
Films about tabloid journalism
HBO documentary films
Sky UK original programming
2020s American films
2020s British films